Weegee is the pseudonym of American photographer Arthur Fellig.

Weegee, Wee Gee or Weegie may also refer to:

People 
 Weegie Thompson (born 1961), former American football player
 William "Wee Gee" Howard, former lead singer of The Dramatics
 Weegie, a demonym for people from Glasgow, Scotland

Other uses 
 WeeGee house, an art museum building in Espoo, Finland
 Weegee, an internet meme featuring the Nintendo character Luigi - see YouTube Poop
 WDGY, nicknamed "WeeGee", a commercial AM radio station licensed to Hudson, Wisconsin, United States

See also 
 Ouija board, commonly pronounced as "weegee board"
 Wiigii, a popular expression in David Willis's webcomics